Max Caputo (born 17 August 2005), is an Australian professional soccer player who plays as a forward for Melbourne City.

Club career

Melbourne City
On 23 April 2021, Caputo earned a scholarship contract at A-League club Melbourne City after spending four years in their youth setup. After some first-team players had left their squad during the 2020–21 season, it was rumoured that Max Caputo would fill into their squad in a Melbourne Derby. At age 15, Caputo made his senior professional debut on 6 June 2021 against Melbourne Victory as a substitute.

Career statistics

Club

References

External links

2005 births
Living people
Australian soccer players
Association football midfielders
Melbourne City FC players
National Premier Leagues players
A-League Men players